St. Joseph's Convent Girls' Senior Secondary School is a girls' convent school located in the city of Jabalpur, Madhya Pradesh, India. It is an English Medium Senior Secondary School for girls affiliated to the C.B.S.E, New Delhi. It conducts classes from kindergarten to the senior secondary level.

History 

The school was founded in 1873 by the Indian Province of the Sisters of St. Joseph of Chambéry. It is administered by the Sisters of St. Joseph's Convent, Jabalpur in accordance to the general rules governing the above congregation. Saint Joseph is the patron Saint of the school. Currently, Sr. Navya is the Principal of the school.

References

External links 

 St. Joseph's Convent Girls' Senior Secondary School (Official Website)

High schools and secondary schools in Madhya Pradesh
Education in Jabalpur